Ștefan Efros (born 8 May 1990) is a Moldovan footballer. He has both Moldovan and Romanian citizenship. He plays as a centre-back for FC Buzău in the Romanian Liga II.

Career 
He started his career at Izvoraș-67 and also played for several teams in Moldovan "A" Division : FC Beșiktaș Chișinău, Real Succes Chișinău and Milsami- Ursidos 2.

Ștefan Efros was awarded best Moldovan beach soccer player  in 2012, and in 2013 represented his country at the Euro Beach Soccer League.

He signed with Speranța Nisporeni in 2013, and in 2017 he became team captain.

International
He made his Moldova national football team debut on 8 June 2019 in a Euro 2020 qualifier against Andorra, as a starter.

References

External links 

1990 births
Living people
Moldovan footballers
Moldovan expatriate footballers
People from Criuleni District
Association football defenders
Moldova international footballers
Moldovan Super Liga players
Speranța Nisporeni players
CS Petrocub Hîncești players
Liga II players
CS Mioveni players
FC Gloria Buzău players
Moldovan expatriate sportspeople in Romania
Expatriate footballers in Romania
Real Succes Chișinău players